Igo is a ghost town in Medicine Township, Rooks County, Kansas, United States.

History
Igo was located in Medicine Township along Big Medicine Creek. A post office was issued to Igo in 1877. The post office was discontinued in 1904. There is nothing left of Igo.

References

Former populated places in Rooks County, Kansas
Former populated places in Kansas
1877 establishments in Kansas
Populated places established in 1877